Spanish Eyes may refer to:

 Spanish Eyes (film), a 1930 British film directed by G. B. Samuelson
 "Spanish Eyes" (1965 song), a song variation of the composition "Moon Over Naples"
 "Spanish Eyes" (Backstreet Boys song) from the album Millennium 
 "Spanish Eyes" (Madonna song) from the album Like a Prayer
 "Spanish Eyes" (U2 song) from the album The Joshua Tree, appeared as the third track on the bonus audio CD
 "Spanish Eyes", a song by Bruce Springsteen on his 2010 album The Promise
 "Spanish Eyes", a song by Ricky Martin on his 1999 self-titled album
 "Spanish Eyes", a song by Tiffany on her 1987 self-titled debut album
 Spanish Eyes (pinball), a 1972 pinball game by Williams Electronics